The Reagan era or Age of Reagan is a periodization of recent American history used by historians and political observers to emphasize that the conservative "Reagan Revolution" led by President Ronald Reagan in domestic and foreign policy had a lasting impact. It overlaps with what political scientists call the Sixth Party System. Definitions of the Reagan era universally include the 1980s, while more extensive definitions may also include the late 1970s, the 1990s, the 2000s, the 2010s, and even the 2020s. In his 2008 book, The Age of Reagan: A History, 1974–2008, historian and journalist Sean Wilentz argues that Reagan dominated this stretch of American history in the same way that Franklin D. Roosevelt and his New Deal legacy dominated the four decades that preceded it.

The Reagan era included ideas and personalities beyond Reagan himself; he is usually characterized as the leader of a broadly-based conservative movement whose ideas dominated national policy-making in areas such as taxes, welfare, defense, the federal judiciary, and the Cold War. Other major conservative figures and organizations of the Reagan era include Jerry Falwell, Phyllis Schlafly, Newt Gingrich, and The Heritage Foundation. The Rehnquist Court, which was inaugurated during Reagan's presidency, handed down several conservative decisions. The Reagan era coincides with the presidency of Reagan, and, in more extensive definitions, the presidencies of Gerald Ford, Jimmy Carter, George H. W. Bush, Bill Clinton, George W. Bush, Barack Obama, Donald Trump, and Joe Biden. Liberals generally lament the Reagan era, while conservatives generally praise it and call for its continuation in the 21st century. Liberals were significantly influenced as well, leading to the Third Way. 

Upon taking office, the Reagan administration implemented an economic policy based on the theory of supply-side economics. Taxes were reduced through the passage of the Economic Recovery Tax Act of 1981, while the administration also cut domestic spending and increased military spending. Increasing deficits motivated the passage of tax increases during the George H. W. Bush and Clinton administrations, but taxes were cut again with the passage of the Economic Growth and Tax Relief Reconciliation Act of 2001. During Clinton's presidency, Republicans won passage of the Personal Responsibility and Work Opportunity Act, a bill which placed several new limits on those receiving federal assistance.

Campaigning for the Democratic nomination in 2008, Barack Obama interpreted how Reagan changed the nation's trajectory:

Dates
Most historians begin the era in 1980, when Reagan was elected president, and usually probe back into the 1970s for the origins of the Reagan era. For example, Kalman (2010) explores multiple crises of the 1970s that eroded confidence in liberal solutions: the rise of the religious right and the reaction against the gay rights movement, feminism and the Equal Rights Amendment, grassroots reactions against busing ordered by federal judges, the defeat in the Vietnam War, the collapse of détente and fears of Soviet power, the challenge of imported cars and textiles, the deindustrialization of the Rust Belt, soaring inflation, stagflation, and the energy crisis, as well as the humiliation the nation suffered during the Iran hostage crisis and the sense of malaise as the nation wondered if its glory days had passed. Kalman shows step by step the process by which one political alternative after another collapsed, leaving Reagan standing.

The term "Reagan era" is often used to refer to the United States only during Reagan's presidency, but it has also taken on an extended meaning that incorporates other periods. The George H. W. Bush presidency (1989–1993), the Clinton presidency (1993–2001), and the George W. Bush presidency (2001–2009) are often treated as extensions of the Reagan era. Wilentz additionally includes the Ford presidency (1974–1977) and the Carter presidency (1977–1981).

The endpoint of the Reagan era is often seen as the election of Democrat Barack Obama in 2008. Midterm elections in 2010 and 2014 seemed to cast doubt on a true end of the Reagan era as conservative Republicans claimed two major victories winning both the House and later the Senate.  However, the sweeping policies pursued by the Obama Administration constituted a clear break with Reagan era social issues, as Americans became more supportive of social issues like gay marriage and the legalization of marijuana.
The 2016 election victory of President Donald Trump has stirred debate over whether his rise signifies the continuation of the Reagan era or represents a paradigm shift for American politics. Political scientist Stephen Skowronek argues that Trump's election shows that the Reagan era continues. Skowronek compares Obama to former presidents like Woodrow Wilson and Richard Nixon, who governed at a time when their own party was generally in the minority at the federal level. Julia Azari, by contrast, argues that Trump's election signifies the end of the Reagan era and the beginning of a new cycle in politics.

Rise

Wilentz traces the start of the Reagan era to the Watergate scandal, which ended the presidency of Richard Nixon and created an opening for a new Republican leader. Along with the Watergate scandal, the assassination of John F. Kennedy, the Vietnam War, and poor economic conditions created widespread public alienation from political leaders in the mid-1970s. A mass movement of population from the cities to the suburbs led to the creation of a new group of voters less attached to New Deal economic policies and machine politics. Reagan and other conservatives successfully presented conservative ideas as an alternative to a public that had grown disillusioned with New Deal liberalism. Reagan's charisma and speaking skills helped him frame conservatism as an optimistic, forward-looking vision for the country. Reagan challenged Nixon's successor, incumbent President Gerald Ford, in the 1976 Republican presidential primaries. Ford defeated Reagan to win the presidential nomination at the 1976 Republican National Convention, but he lost in the general election to the Democratic nominee, Jimmy Carter.

During his presidency, Carter alienated many of those who had voted for him in 1976, including many in his own party. In the 1980 Democratic primaries, Carter defeated a strong challenge from the left in the form of Senator Ted Kennedy, who had clashed with Carter over the establishment of a national health insurance system. Carter, and the Democratic Party as a whole, also alienated other voters, while the conservative movement gathered strength. A continually poor economy bred frustration over taxes, and voters became increasingly receptive to those advocating for a smaller government. A backlash also developed against affirmative action programs, as some whites claimed that the programs constituted reverse discrimination. The president had won a majority of evangelical Protestant voters in 1976, but the increasingly-politicized Christian right came to strongly oppose his presidency. Many of these religious voters were swayed by the public campaigns of leaders such as Jerry Falwell of the Moral Majority and Phyllis Schlafly, who opposed ratification of the Equal Rights Amendment. Another important conservative organization, The Heritage Foundation, emerged as an important conservative think tank that developed and advocated conservative policies.

With the backing of many in the conservative movement, Reagan defeated establishment favorite George H. W. Bush, moderate Congressman John B. Anderson, and others in the 1980 Republican primaries. To ensure party unity, Reagan named Bush as his running mate at the 1980 Republican National Convention, even though Bush had characterized Reagan's supply-side economics as "voodoo economics". Reagan mobilized his base by campaigning on his conservative positions, while the Carter campaign sought to portray Reagan as a dangerous extremist. An improving economy helped Carter overtake Reagan in the October polling, but Reagan won a decisive victory in an October 28 debate. On election day, Reagan narrowly won a majority in the popular vote but took the electoral vote by a wide margin, carrying 44 states. In the concurrent congressional elections, Republicans won several seats in the House of Representatives and took control of the Senate for the first time since the 1950s.

Reagan's presidency

Upon taking office, Reagan argued that the United States faced a dire crisis, and that the best way to address this crisis was through conservative reforms. His major policy priorities were increasing military spending, cutting taxes, reducing non-military federal spending, and restricting federal regulations. Reagan believed that reducing the role of the government would lead to increased economic growth, which in turn would lead to higher revenues that would help pay down the national debt. Working with Congressman Jack Kemp, the Reagan administration introduced a major tax cut bill  that won the support of enough Republicans and conservative Democrats to pass both houses of Congress. In August 1981, Reagan signed the Economic Recovery Tax Act of 1981, which enacted a 27% across-the-board federal income tax cut over three years, as well as a separate bill that reduced federal spending, especially in anti-poverty programs.

A recession in the early part of Reagan's term, combined with tax cuts and increased military spending, led to an increasing deficit. Democrats won several seats in the House of Representatives in the 1982 mid-term elections. Reagan's approval ratings fell to 35%, and many Democrats believed that their party could defeat Reagan in the 1984 presidential election and roll back some of the Reagan administration policies. A strong economic recovery that began in 1983 boosted Reagan's approval ratings, and the administration argued that the tax cuts had been the primary factor in turning the economy around. In the 1984 presidential election, Reagan won his party's re-nomination without facing a serious challenge, while former Vice President Walter Mondale won the Democratic nomination. On election day, Reagan won 59% of the popular vote and carried 49 states, leading to speculation of a permanent realignment in U.S. politics towards the Republican Party.

Despite his re-election, Reagan faced significantly more difficulties in enacting conservative policies in his second term. His domestic agenda was hindered by growing deficits and the fallout of the Iran–Contra affair. However, the administration did win a significant foreign policy success when Reagan and Soviet leader Mikhail Gorbachev reached the Intermediate-Range Nuclear Forces Treaty INF Treaty in 1987. Reagan also appointed numerous conservative judges, including Associate Justice Antonin Scalia and William Rehnquist, who Reagan elevated to the position of Chief Justice. The Rehnquist Court would hand down several conservative decisions in ensuing years. Vice President Bush defeated Senator Bob Dole and televangelist Pat Robertson to win the 1988 Republican primaries. Aided by Reagan's renewed popularity, Bush defeated Michael Dukakis in the 1988 presidential election.

Reagan's successors

Bush's presidency focused largely on foreign affairs, and he faced a series of major foreign policy issues as the Eastern Bloc collapsed. Many of Bush's top foreign policy appointments, including National Security Adviser Brent Scowcroft, were realists who were influenced by Henry Kissinger. While the Berlin Wall fell and other Soviet-aligned countries experienced turmoil, Bush pursued friendly relations with Gorbachev, which played a part in the Soviet Union's assent to the reunification of Germany.

Bush launched a successful invasion of Panama in 1989 and led a multinational coalition against Iraq in the 1991 Gulf War. After the quick U.S. victory in the Gulf War, Bush's approval ratings soared. However, the Bush administration found less success in domestic policy, where deficits continued to be a major issue. Though Bush had promised not to raise taxes at the 1988 Republican National Convention, his hand was forced in part by the Gramm–Rudman–Hollings Balanced Budget Act, a 1985 law that purportedly required a balanced budget by 1993. After a long battle with the Democratic Congress, Bush agreed to sign the Omnibus Budget Reconciliation Act of 1990, which contained a mix of tax increases and spending cuts. Conservative Republicans, who had never fully accepted Bush despite his move towards the right during the 1980s, were outraged by the deal. 

Adding to the administration's challenges, the country entered a recession in 1990, with the national unemployment rate rising to 7.8%. Even the fall of the Soviet Union in December 1991 did not greatly help Bush, as many conservatives credited Reagan's policies for the collapse of the U.S. long-time rival. Bush won his party's re-nomination after defeating a challenge from right-wing commentator and former Reagan official Pat Buchanan in the 1992 Republican presidential primaries. In the general election, Bush faced Democratic Governor Bill Clinton and an independent candidate, Ross Perot. Perot ran a populist campaign that focused on opposing the North American Free Trade Agreement and Bush's failure to balance the budget. Clinton, a founding member of the centrist Democratic Leadership Council (DLC), focused on the poor economic conditions. In the three-way race, Clinton won a majority of the electoral vote and took 43% of the popular vote, while Bush 37.4% of the popular vote and Perot took 18.9%.

Clinton's victory made him the first Democratic president since Jimmy Carter left office in 1981, and he began his term with a Democratic Congress. Though Clinton won early legislative victories such as passage of the Family and Medical Leave Act of 1993 and the Omnibus Budget Reconciliation Act of 1993, his administration was damaged by a series of minor scandals and the failure of his health care reform proposal. In the 1994 mid-term elections, Republicans took control of both houses of Congress. In response, Clinton hired political consultant Dick Morris, who advocated a strategy of Triangulation between the Republican and Democratic members of Congress. In a major budget stand-off that involved two government shutdowns, Clinton won congressional approval of his own budget proposal, which avoided the deep cuts Medicare and other programs that had been sought by Speaker of the House Newt Gingrich and other congressional Republicans. In 1996, Clinton signed the Personal Responsibility and Work Opportunity Act, a Republican-authored bill which placed several new limits on those receiving federal assistance.  Clinton had called for a reform of the welfare system during his 1992 campaign, wanting to add changes such as work requirements for recipients.

In the 1996 presidential election, Clinton defeated Republican nominee Bob Dole by a wide margin in both the popular vote and the electoral vote. As Republicans retained control of Congress, he was unable to advance much of his domestic agenda. Economic growth was especially strong during Clinton's second term, and the unemployment dropped to 4% in 2000. In 1998, the government experienced its first budget surplus since the 1960s. Much of Clinton's second term was dominated by impeachment proceedings against Clinton, which stemmed from his affair with White House intern Monica Lewinsky. Though the House voted to impeach Clinton, he was acquitted by the Senate, as all Senate Democrats and several Senate Republicans voted not guilty on both impeachment charges. Due to the strong economy, Clinton's Vice President, Al Gore, most Washington pundits regarded Gore as the early favorite in the 2000 presidential election. However, in an extremely close and contested election that ended in a controversial Supreme Court decision, Governor George W. Bush of Texas, the son of former President Bush, defeated Gore.

Bush's administration included many prominent figures from previous Republican administrations, including Donald Rumsfeld, Dick Cheney, and Colin Powell. Upon taking office, Bush signed a major tax cut, the Economic Growth and Tax Relief Reconciliation Act of 2001. After the September 11 attacks, the Bush administration launched the Afghanistan War and the War on Terror, a global conflict against al-Qaeda and other groups. In 2003, the administration launched the Iraq War, which deposed Iraqi leader Saddam Hussein. Despite the growing unpopularity of the Iraq War, Bush defeated Democrat John Kerry in the 2004 presidential election. In the two years after Bush's re-election, the Jack Abramoff scandals, the administration's handling of Hurricane Katrina, Bush's failed attempt to reform Social Security, and the Iraq War's continued unpopularity all weakened Bush's public standing. Aided by Bush's popularity and the Mark Foley scandal, Democrats won control of Congress in the 2006 elections. In 2008, a collapse in housing prices led to a major financial crisis, which marked the start of a prolonged economic downturn known as the Great Recession. In the 2008 presidential election, held in the midst of the financial crisis, Democrat Barack Obama defeated Republican John McCain. Obama defeated Republican nominee Mitt Romney and won re-election in 2012. In the 2016 presidential election, Republican nominee Donald Trump defeated Democratic nominee Hillary Clinton, despite losing the popular vote. In the 2020 presidential election, held in the midst of the COVID-19 pandemic, Democratic nominee and former Vice President Joe Biden defeated Trump.

Popular culture

Tom Clancy wrote three best-selling novels that illuminate the Reagan era: The Hunt for Red October (1984), Red Storm Rising (1986), and The Cardinal of the Kremlin (1988), which reflect Reagan-era Cold War values. The Soviet Union as an evil empire and the superiority of American values and technology are all themes both of Clancy's thrillers and Reagan's rhetoric. Policy elites used these novels (and the filming of one of them) to promote their ideas of national security to the American public. Kendrick Lamar has a song titled "Ronald Reagan Era" off of his 2011 album Section.80, and Killer Mike has a song titled "Reagan" off his 2012 album R.A.P. Music.

Reagan appears as a character in the comic books The Dark Knight Returns (1986) and Legends (1986–87).

International
Many scholars take an international perspective, linking the Reagan era with the Thatcher Era in Britain. As one scholar explained,
Throughout many of the capitalist democracies in Western Europe and in North America, the recession that began with the sharp rise in petroleum prices in 1973–74 signaled an epochal shift in the patchwork of growth- based economic and social policies....The demise of Keynesianism which followed meant far more than the obsolescence of an economic doctrine that had been used to justify a broad range of economic policies. It represented a significant retreat from a vision of society—the Keynesian welfare state—that had motivated state strategies to harmonise interests through social policy, to politically regulate the market economy and thereby reduce class and diverse social conflicts, and to promulgate for the state a tutelary role in securing business and trade union acquiescence (and less commonly approval) for a limited set of important economic policies.

Historiography
Historian Doug Rossinow reported in 2007, "As of this writing, among academic historians, the Reagan revisionists—who view the 1980s as an era of mixed blessings at worst, and of great forward strides in some renditions—hold the field". Other scholars agree on the importance of the Reagan era.

According to John Kenneth White, the Reagan era ended in the early 21st century, as typified by the election and reelection of Barack Obama in 2008 and 2012. White argues that the Reagan coalition was shrinking in size and in self-confidence. The weak Republican response to the financial crisis of 2007–2008 was a major blow. White argues that major cultural and demographic changes helped end the Reagan era.  Besides the rapid growth in college-educated voters, White emphasizes revolutions in terms of race, family, gay rights, and religion. The very rapid growth of immigration from Asia and Latin America changed the American population structure, and had a special impact on California. The once sacrosanct ideal of the nuclear family gave way to new tolerance regarding premarital sex, easy divorce, single parenting, and cohabitation. The religious conservatives tried to hold the line on abortion and gay rights. The conservative fundamentalist religious denominations had been rapidly expanding before and during the Reagan years, and were a key base of his support. Their growth suddenly stopped and decline began, producing a rapid growth of secularization. The combination of these factors, White argues, produced, “the death of the Reagan coalition."

See also

 Conservatism in the United States
 History of conservatism in the United States
 History of the United States (1980–1991)
 History of the United States (1991–2008)
 Neoliberalism
 Political positions of Ronald Reagan
 Sixth Party System

References

Bibliography

 Carlisle, Rodney P.  and J. Geoffrey Golson. Turning Points—Actual and Alternate Histories: The Reagan Era from the Iran Crisis to Kosovo (2007)
 Collins, Robert M. Transforming America: Politics and Culture during the Reagan Years (2007)
 Conlin, Joseph R. "Morning in America: The Age of Reagan 1980–1993", ch. 50 in Conlin, The American Past: A Survey of American History (2008)
 
 Ehrman, John. The Eighties: America in the Age of Reagan (2005)
 Fried, Amy, and Douglas B. Harris. "Chapter Three. Here to Help? Movement Conservatism and the State in the Reagan Era." in At War with Government ( Columbia University Press, 2021) pp. 46-85.
 Green, John C., and James L. Guth. "Who Is Right and Who Is Left?: Activist Coalitions in the Reagan Era." in Do Elections Matter? (Routledge, 2020) pp. 32-56.

 Hayward, Steven F. The Age of Reagan: The Fall of the Old Liberal Order: 1964–1980 (2007); vol 2: The Age of Reagan: The Conservative Counterrevolution: 1980–1989 (2009)
 Hixson, Walter L. "'Red Storm Rising': Tom Clancy novels and the cult of national security," Diplomatic History, (1993) 17#4 pp 599–613
 Lavanty, Donald F. "The Reagan Era of Politics and Healthcare." in Political Aspects of Health Care ( Palgrave Pivot, 2018) pp. 53-64.

 
 
 Phillips-Fein, Kim.  "Ronald Reagan: Fate, Freedom, and Making of History," Enterprise and Society, Volume 8, Number 4, December 2007, pp. 986–988.
 Ponce de Leon, Charles L. "The New Historiography of the 1980s", Reviews in American History Volume 36, Number 2, June 2008, pp. 303–314
 Rossinow, Doug. The Reagan Era: A History of the 1980s (2015)
 Seib, Gerald F. We Should Have Seen it Coming: From Reagan to Trump--a Front-row Seat to a Political Revolution (Random House, 2021).

 
 Straub, Whitney. "Further into the Right: The Ever-Expanding Historiography of the U.S. New Right," Journal of Social History, Volume 42, Number 1, Fall 2008, pp. 183–194
 Troy, Gil. The Reagan Revolution: A Very Short Introduction (2009)
 Vogel, Joseph. James Baldwin and the 1980s: Witnessing the Reagan Era (University of Illinois Press, 2018) James Baldwin was a famous black writer.
 White, John. Barack Obama's America: How New Conceptions of Race, Family, and Religion Ended the Reagan Era (U of Michigan Press, 2018) excerpt
 
 Wirls, Daniel. Buildup: The Politics of Defense in the Reagan  Era (1992). 247 pp.
 Woods, Randall B. "Chapter 13: The Culture of Narcissism: The Reagan Era," in Woods, Quest for Identity: The U.S. Since 1945 (2005)

 
Ronald Reagan
1980s in the United States
Conservatism in the United States
Eras of United States history